Kai Zachary Perlado Sotto (born May 11, 2002) is a Filipino professional basketball player for Hiroshima Dragonflies of the Japanese B.League. Listed at 7 feet and 3 inches (2.21 m) and  he plays the center position. He also played for the Ateneo Blue Eaglets of the University Athletic Association of the Philippines (UAAP) before moving to The Skill Factory (TSF) in Atlanta, Georgia. He has represented the Philippines national team in several senior and youth tournaments.

Early life and education
Sotto was born on May 11, 2002, in Las Piñas, Philippines, to Ervin Sotto and Pamela Sotto. Sotto began playing basketball when he was four years old. Sotto began studying at Saint Francis of Assisi College to pursue his primary education. He grew up idolizing basketball players Tim Duncan, June Mar Fajardo and Kristaps Porziņģis. 

In March 2019, Sotto left Ateneo as a third-year high school student to move to the United States in an attempt to advance his basketball career. In the United States, he continued his studies at the Miami School in Hamilton, Ohio while simultaneously dealing with commitments with The Skill Factory and NBA G League Ignite. He graduated from Miami School in April 2021.

Amateur career

High school career
In April 2016, Sotto entered the Ateneo de Manila High School and joined its junior basketball program, the Ateneo Blue Eaglets in Quezon City. In March 2018, he led his team to a UAAP Basketball Championship title juniors division and was named in the finals MVP after averaging 17 points, 13 rebounds and 6.3 blocks per game in three games. In the following season, Sotto averaged 25.1 points, 13.9 rebounds and 2.6 blocks per game and earned UAAP juniors MVP honors.

The Skill Factory
On November 9, 2019, Sotto announced that he would join The Skill Factory, a preparatory program based in Atlanta, Georgia. In his debut one day later, he recorded 18 points and 12 rebounds in a 65–61 loss to IMG Academy. On January 21, 2020, Sotto was named MVP of the King Invitational tournament, averaging 27 points, 10.6 rebounds, 4.3 blocks and three assists in three games. In February 15, 2020, he participated in the Basketball Without Borders Global Camp held during NBA All-Star Weekend in Chicago.

U.S. college recruiting
In the United States, Sotto was considered a consensus four-star recruit by major recruiting services. He was recruited by several NCAA Division I programs. It was announced on May 13, 2020, that Sotto joined the NBA G League Ignite, forgoing his college eligibility.

Professional career
On May 13, 2020, Sotto signed with the NBA G League and joined the NBA G League Ignite as part of the league's new developmental program operating outside its traditional team structure. Ignite joined the 2020–21 season as part of the traditional team structure following the non-participation of several regular teams in a competition played inside a bio-secure bubble. However, Sotto was expected to miss several games with Ignite after he opted to play for the Philippine national team at the 2021 FIBA Asia Cup qualifiers given by logistical issues caused by COVID-19 pandemic-related travel restrictions. Despite being able to return to the United States, the NBA G League announced that it has reached a "mutual decision" that Sotto would not be able to rejoin Ignite.

Due to Sotto joining Ignite, he is ineligible to play for a college team in NCAA Division I games. Overtime reportedly expressed interest for Sotto to join their basketball league, Overtime Elite. He was also ineligible for the 2021 NBA draft, having recently graduated from high school in the same year and was only be able to join in 2022 at the earliest.

Adelaide 36ers (2021–2023) 
On April 21, 2021, Sotto signed a contract to play for the Adelaide 36ers of the Australian National Basketball League (NBL). He was signed as a "Special Restricted Player", which means that he is treated the same way as a local player and is not subject to the NBL's import limit. Sotto is guaranteed two years in his contract with an option to play for the 36ers for a third year.

On January 30, 2022, Sotto recorded 12 points, four rebounds, and one assist in 21 minutes of play, in an upset victory, 88–83 over the reigning champions and top-seeded Melbourne United.

On April 28, Sotto declared for the 2022 NBA draft. He worked out for multiple NBA teams but went undrafted. He then switched agents and on July 29, he announced that he would return to play for Adelaide for a second straight year.

On October 28, 2022, Sotto recorded a season-high 16 points and seven rebounds in a 99–70 loss to the New Zealand Breakers. On January 8, 2023, he tied his season-high of 16 points and put up five rebounds and two blocks in an 85–83 loss to the Breakers.

On February 5, 2023, Sotto announced that he is leaving the team and will sign with a team overseas.

Hiroshima Dragonflies (2023–present) 
On February 7, 2023, Sotto signed a contract with Hiroshima Dragonflies of the Japanese B.League. His contract is until the end of the season as he is planning to join the 2023 NBA Summer League.

On March 18, 2023. Sotto recorded his first B.League double-double. He tallied 21 points and 12 rebounds in a 90-72 win over Ibaraki Robots.

National team career

Junior national team
Sotto made his national team debut for the Philippines at the 2017 SEABA Under-16 Championship in Quezon City, Philippines. He averaged 16.8 points, 8.5 rebounds and three blocks per game, leading his team to a gold medal. Sotto registered 15 points, 12 rebounds and four blocks in an 83–62 win over Malaysia in the final. In April 2018, he represented the Philippines at the FIBA Under-16 Asian Championship in Foshan, China, where he led his team to fourth place. Sotto averaged 16.8 points, 13.5 rebounds, and 2.5 blocks per game and was named to the tournament's Mythical First Team. He recorded 28 points, 21 rebounds and three blocks in a quarterfinal win over Japan, before recording 26 points, 21 rebounds and six blocks in a semifinal loss to China. He led the event in rebounds and blocks per game, as well as player efficiency rating (21.5).
Sotto played for the Philippines at the 2018 FIBA Under-17 World Cup in Argentina, where he averaged 16.4 points, 10.6 rebounds and 2.3 blocks per game. He led his team to 13th place, its best finish at the event. In a classification game win over Egypt, he had his best performance at the tournament, tallying 28 points, 17 rebounds and three blocks. Sotto represented the Philippines at the 2019 FIBA Under-19 World Cup in Heraklion, Greece, where his team finished in 14th place. He averaged 11.7 points and 7.9 rebounds, while tying with Ibou Dianko Badji for a tournament-high 3.1 blocks per game.

Senior national team
Sotto was supposed to make a debut with the senior national team at the 2021 FIBA Asia Cup qualifiers in early 2021 and went to the Philippines. However, due to logistical issues and abrupt hosting changes for the qualifiers caused by the COVID-19 pandemic, Sotto had to return the United States to rejoin Ignite. 

On June 16, 2021, Sotto made it to the final 12 man lineup at the 2021 FIBA Asia Cup qualifiers. The following year, he played in the fourth window of the 2023 FIBA World Cup qualifiers.

Career statistics

NBL

Personal life
His father, Ervin Sotto, and his godfather, Ranidel de Ocampo, played basketball professionally in the Philippine Basketball Association (PBA). Ervin Sotto stands  and Pamela Sotto stands . He has two siblings.

Awards and honors

UAAP
 UAAP Season 79 Juniors Rookie of the Year (2016)
 UAAP Season 80 Juniors Mythical Five (2017)
 UAAP Season 80 Juniors Finals MVP (2017)
 UAAP Season 81 Juniors MVP (2018)
 UAAP Season 81 Juniors Mythical Five (2018)

Australian National Basketball League
 NBL Fans MVP (2022, 2023)

Philippine national team
 Gold medal at the 2017 SEABA Under-16 Championship
 2017 FIBA Under-16 Asian Championship Mythical First Team

References

External links

2002 births
Living people
Adelaide 36ers players
Ateneo de Manila University alumni
Basketball players from Metro Manila
Centers (basketball)
Filipino expatriate basketball people in Australia
Filipino expatriate basketball people in Japan
Filipino expatriate basketball people in the United States
Filipino men's basketball players
Hiroshima Dragonflies players
Members of Iglesia ni Cristo
People from Las Piñas
Philippines men's national basketball team players